The 2022 IFSC Climbing European Championships, the 14th edition, were held in Munich, Germany from 11 to 18 August 2022 as part of 2022 European Championships. The championships consisted of lead, speed, bouldering, and combined events.

Medal summary

Medal table

References

External links 
 Official website
 Results book

IFSC Climbing European Championships
European Climbing Championships
IFSC
IFSC
Sports competitions in Munich
2022 European Championships